The Hancock Town Hall and Fire Hall is a public building located at 399 Quincy Street in the Quincy Street Historic District in Hancock, Michigan. It is also known as the Hancock City Hall. It was designated a Michigan State Historic Site in 1977 and was listed on the National Register of Historic Places in 1981.

History 
By the end of the 19th century, the citizens of Hancock wanted a substantial government building that would reflect the city's prosperity and distinguish it from the more impermanent mining villages in the surrounding Keweenaw Peninsula. In 1898, the Quincy Mine company sold a lot on Quincy Street to the city, and the Marquette firm of Charlton, Gilbert and Demar was hired to design a Town Hall and Fire Hall building on the site. E.E. Grip and Company of Ishpeming built the structure at a cost of $15,000, which opened in January 1899. The building originally housed the city clerk's office and council chambers, along with the marshall's office, jail, and the fire department.

Description 
The Hancock Town Hall is a two-story building constructed of rock-faced red Jacobsville Sandstone set in even courses, exhibiting Richardsonian Romanesque, Dutch, and Flemish architectural influences. It has a gable roof and a square tower with belfry at one corner; the tower originally had a steep conical roof. The main facade is dominated by a broadly arched window filled with diagonally paned glass and flanked by smaller windows.

References

Fire stations on the National Register of Historic Places in Michigan
City and town halls on the National Register of Historic Places in Michigan
Buildings and structures in Houghton County, Michigan
Fire stations completed in 1899
Government buildings completed in 1899
Towers completed in 1899
Michigan State Historic Sites in Houghton County
Historic district contributing properties in Michigan
Defunct fire stations in Michigan
1899 establishments in Michigan
National Register of Historic Places in Houghton County, Michigan
City and town halls in Michigan
Hancock, Michigan